Clive Oscar Lewis  is a business psychologist and author. He is a workplace mediator in the UK and a frequent commentator on employment and industrial relations issues.

Public affairs
Lewis was interviewed by the BBC to talk about the role mediation could play in the 2009 Royal Mail dispute. In the same year, the Algerian government invited him to give a speech titled "Mediation – The British Perspective", at a conference attended by about 400 members of the Algerian judiciary. He has given similar talks in Jordan and the European Parliament. He was an adviser on the Gibbons Review into UK workplace practices.

He has attended a meeting of the All-Party Parliamentary Group for Alternative Dispute Resolution and was honorary secretary for the Civil Mediation Council until 2015. His research on mediation and organisation diagnosis in the National Health Service was shortlisted for an award by the Association for Business Psychology in 2017.

Local roles
In 2011, he was awarded the OBE for his work in mediation and for chairing the government commissioned REACH report. He was appointed Deputy Lieutenant of Gloucestershire in 2012. He is a member of the board of governors for the University of the West of England, Bristol.

Lewis founded the Bridge Builders Mentoring Scheme in 2014. The scheme focuses on social mobility for boys and girls from disadvantaged backgrounds. He is also founder of the Senior Women’s Lunch held annually at the House of Lords.

Publications
He is the author of 14 books, including How to Master Workplace and Employment Mediation, published by Bloomsbury in 2015. His book on tackling difficult conversations was featured in the Sunday Times.

References

Year of birth missing (living people)
Living people
British psychologists
Deputy Lieutenants of Gloucestershire
Officers of the Order of the British Empire